Russell City may refer to:
 Russell City, California
 Russell City, Pennsylvania